The Alabastine Mine is an underground gypsum mine in Wyoming, Michigan, originally dug by hand in 1907. The mine once included an underground stable for the mules used to haul the gypsum.

Plaster production
The gypsum from this mine was used to manufacture plaster, both for exterior use as stucco and for a tinted interior wall covering known as 'alabastine'.

Use as a Fallout Shelter
New access elevators to the mine were constructed in order to convert the mine to a storage area. Parts of the mine served as a Cold War fallout shelter.

Storage Facility
Since 1957, the mine has been operated by Michigan Natural Storage as a storage facility. It leases space to a firm that provides microfilm records storage for many Michigan courthouses.

References

External links
 Kent County Inventory of Underground Mines 
 Mapping the Michigan Natural Storage Gypsum Mine Using a Geological Information System 
 Alabastine Mine (with photos) 
 CHAPTER XXXVIII: GYPSUM AND PLASTER OF PARIS. - Baxter, Albert, History of the City of Grand Rapids, New York and Grand Rapids: Munsell & Company, Publishers, 1891. (Name Index)

Underground mines in the United States
Buildings and structures in Kent County, Michigan
Grand Rapids metropolitan area
Mines in Michigan
1907 establishments in Michigan